Raja Bhalindra Singh (9 October 1919 – 16 April 1992) was an Indian first class cricketer and Maharajkumar of Patiala. His father was Maharaja Bhupinder Singh and his brother, Maharaja Yadavindra Singh, played Test cricket for India.

Bhalindra was a right-handed middle order batsman and handy right arm slow bowler. He played just one first class match in England, for Cambridge University in 1939 against Northamptonshire. The rest of his games were played for Southern Punjab and Patiala back home in India. His only century was made for Southern Punjab against Northern India in 1943-44.

After finishing his cricket career, he was very active as a national sports administrator. Singh was a member of the International Olympic Committee from 1947–92, and was the president of the Indian Olympic Association from 1960–75 and from 1980-84. He was instrumental in organising and bringing the 9th Asian Games to Delhi in 1982. Singh was awarded the Padma Bhushan award in 1983.

His son Raja Randhir Singh was the secretary general of Indian Olympic Association from 1987 to 2012. Randhir has also been the Acting President of Olympic Council of Asia (OCA) since 2021. Randhir was also the Secretary General of the Olympic Council of Asia since 1991-2015, the representative for India on the International Olympic Committee (IOC) from 2001-2014, and since 2014, Randhir has been an honorary member of the IOC. Randhir is a 1979 recipient of the Arjuna Award.

References

External links
 

1919 births
1992 deaths
Indian cricketers
Indian sports executives and administrators
Cambridge University cricketers
Southern Punjab cricketers
Patiala cricketers
Recipients of the Padma Bhushan in sports
Aitchison College alumni
Alumni of Magdalene College, Cambridge